The 1975–76 Greek Football Cup was the 34th edition of the Greek Football Cup. The competition culminated with the Greek Cup Final, held at AEK Stadium, on 9 June 1976. The match was contested by Iraklis and Olympiacos, with Iraklis winning by 6–5 on penalty shootout, after a 4–4 draw at the end of the extra time.

Calendar

Knockout phase
In the knockout phase, teams play against each other over a single match. If the match ends up as a draw, extra time will be played. If a winner doesn't occur after the extra time the winner emerges by penalty shoot-out.The mechanism of the draws for each round is as follows:
There are no seedings, and teams from the same group can be drawn against each other.

First round

|}

Bracket

Second round

|}

Round of 16

|}

Quarter-finals

|}

Semi-finals

|}

Final

The 32nd Greek Cup Final was played at the AEK Stadium.

References

External links
Greek Cup 1975-76 at RSSSF

Greek Football Cup seasons
Greek Cup
Cup